Elections to Tameside Metropolitan Borough Council were held on 10 June 2004.

Due to demographic changes in the Borough since its formation in 1973, and in common with most other English Councils in 2004, substantial boundary changes were implemented in time for these elections.

After the election, the composition of the council was as follows:

Results

Ashton Hurst ward

Ashton St. Michael's ward

Ashton Waterloo ward

Audenshaw ward

Denton North East ward

Denton South ward

Denton West ward

Droylsden East ward

Droylsden West ward

Dukinfield ward

Dukinfield / Stalybridge ward

Hyde Godley ward

Hyde Newton ward

Hyde Werneth ward

Longdendale ward

Mossley ward

St. Peters ward

Stalybridge North ward 
Councillor Frank Robinson died in 2006. The seat was retained for Labour by George Roberts in a by-election on 29 June 2006.

Stalybridge South ward

References

2004 English local elections
2004
2000s in Greater Manchester